The Moroka River is a perennial river of the Mitchell River catchment, located in the Alpine region of the Australian state of Victoria.

Location and features
The Moroka River rises below Picture Point near Mount Wellington on the Great Dividing Range, north of Avon Wilderness Park. This river flows generally east, then northeast, then north, then in a highly meandering course generally northwest, then north, and finally northeast, joined by three tributaries including the Little River (Moroka), before reaching its confluence with the Wonnangatta River in remote country within the Alpine National Park in the Shire of Wellington. The river descends  over its  course.

The river flows through the Moroka Gorge, nestled below Mount Kent, Mount Dawson, Cromwell Knob, and Billy Goat Bluff. Beyond First Falls, the route is unmarked and difficult.

See also

 List of rivers in Australia

References

External links
 
 

East Gippsland catchment
Rivers of Gippsland (region)
Victorian Alps